Paolo Panelli (15 July 1925 – 18 May 1997) was an Italian comedian and film actor. He appeared in 55 films between 1948 and 1996. He was married to Bice Valori.

Selected filmography

 Guarany (1948)
 Arrivederci, papà! (1948)
 Vertigine d'amore (1949)
 Flying Squadron (1949) - Allievo
 Against the Law (1950) - Tremolino
 Hearts at Sea (1950) - Leone - un allievo ufficiale
 Paris Is Always Paris (1951) - Nicolino Percuoco
 The Last Sentence (1951) - Michele
 Wife for a Night (1952) - Gualteri
 Solo per te Lucia (1952) - Tonino Moriconi
 I Chose Love (1953)
 Voice of Silence (1953)
 Scampolo 53 (1953)
  Laugh! Laugh! Laugh! (1954) - Innamorato litigioso
 Bella, non piangere! (1955) - Il soldato balbuziente
 Submarine Attack (1955)
 La moglie è uguale per tutti (1955) - Vincenzo
 Folgore Division (1955)
 I pinguini ci guardano (1956)
 Terrore sulla città (1957)
 I dritti (1957) - Peppino, il barista
 Le dritte (1958) - Ercole Scatola
 Mia nonna poliziotto (1958) - Ernesto
 Tough Guys (1960) - Hercule Robinot
 Le signore (1960) - Attilio Brando
 I Teddy boys della canzone (1960) - Paolino
 The Assassin (1961) - Paolo
 Akiko (1961) - Felice
 Cronache del '22 (1961)
 The Shortest Day (1962) - (uncredited)
 Siamo tutti pomicioni (1963) - The Sicilian Husband (segment "Pomicioni di provincia")
 I marziani hanno 12 mani (1964) - X1
 I Kill, You Kill (1965) - Marchese Achille Pozzuoli (segment "La danza delle ore")
 Amore all'italiana (1966) - Ettore / l'arbitro / Amleto
 Me, Me, Me... and the Others (1966) - Photographer
 Rita the Mosquito (1966) - Peppino
 Perdono (1966) - Aldo - father of Federico
 Gli altri, gli altri... e noi (1967)
 Zum Zum Zum - La canzone che mi passa per la testa (1969) - Paolo
 Zum zum zum n° 2 (1969) - Nane'
 Gli infermieri della mutua (1969) - Alvaro il benzinaio
 Nel giorno del Signore (1970) - Cliente osteria
 Mezzanotte d'amore (1970) - Paolo De Barberis
 Count Tacchia (1982) - Alvaro Puricelli
 Sing Sing (1983) - Augusto Mastronardi (first story)
 Questo e Quello (1983) - Doctor (segment "Quello... col basco rosso")
 Grandi magazzini (1986) - Evaristo's father
 Quelli del casco (1988)
 Splendor (1989) - Signor Paolo
 Towards Evening (1990) - Galliano, the hairdresser
 Parenti serpenti (1992) - Grandfather Saverio

References

External links

1925 births
1997 deaths
Italian male film actors
Male actors from Rome
Accademia Nazionale di Arte Drammatica Silvio D'Amico alumni
20th-century Italian male actors